Kantonsschule Zürcher Unterland (KZU) is a Langzeit und Kurzzeit-Mittelschule in Bülach, Switzerland in the Zurich metropolitan area.

References

External links
 Kantonsschule Zürcher Unterland

Bülach
Upper secondary schools in the Canton of Zürich